Mikhail Arkhipovich Fostikov (– 29 July 1966) was a Cossack officer in the Imperial Russian Army and an officer of the counterrevolutionary White movement during the Russian Civil War, reaching the rank of lieutenant general.

Biography 
Fostikov was born in Batalpashinsk (now Cherkessk, Karachay-Cherkessia, Russia). His father was an officer with the Kuban Cossacks. He graduated from the Alexander Military Law Academy in 1907 and the Nikolaev Academy of the General Staff, Russia's senior staff college, in 1917. During World War I he served as a junior officer in the 1st Labinsk Cossack Regiment on the Caucasus Front.

Fostikov came again to the Kuban after the October Revolution and joined the White movement at Stavropol. In the summer of 1918 he established the 1st Kuban Cossack Regiment under Andrei Shkuro. He later banded together with the Volunteer Army with his regiment integrated into the 2nd Kuban Cossack Division under Sergei Ulagay. In September 1919 Fostikov was promoted to commander of the Kuban Mounted Brigade and the 1st Kuban Regiment as part of Shkuro's Kuban Corps. In December he was given command of the 2nd Kuban Cossack Division.

In February 1920 Fostikov was wounded near Stavropol and he was separated from the Kuban forces. His soldiers conveyed him to Batalpashinsk, where he formed a White partisan group, the People's Army for the Regeneration of Russia in May.  His units operated behind enemy lines during the unsuccessful landing of Kuban Cossacks under Ulagay on the Taman Peninsula that summer. He led his forces into the Democratic Republic of Georgia before they were eventually evacuated to Feodosia in Crimea to join the forces of Pyotr Wrangel. Fostikov commanded an independent Kuban Cossack Brigade from September to November, fighting against the Red Army attempting to enter the peninsula across the Syvash wetlands. He was evacuated along with the rest of Wrangel's forces to Turkey.

Fostikov spent seven months in camps on Lemnos before in June 1921 departing to Yugoslavia, where he worked as a teacher. He was arrested after the Belgrade Offensive by Soviet forces but was released. He died in a Belgrade hospital in 1966 and is buried at Stara Pazova in Serbia.

See also
Kuban Cossacks
White movement
Volunteer Army
Russian Civil War

References

Sources 

1886 births
1966 deaths
Russian military personnel of World War I
Russian generals
White movement generals
White Russian emigrants to Yugoslavia